David Burns (born 1963) is an American sportscaster who works for NASCAR on NBC as a pit reporter for the NASCAR Cup Series and Xfinity Series as well as a substitute play-by-play on standalone Xfinity Series races. He has been a motorsports analyst for over 25 years and counting.

Career

After ESPN lost its rights to broadcasting NASCAR races, Burns returned to NBC (who replaced TNT and ESPN after outbidding both networks for the TV coverage) and became one of four pit reporters for the network's Cup and Xfinity Series (previously Nationwide) events, along with Mike Massaro (who also moved over from ESPN), Marty Snider (who also was a NASCAR on NBC pit reporter with Burns from 2001 to 2006), and Kelli Stavast. Burns and Massaro were signed by NBC to join the broadcast team on November 6, 2014.

Personal life
Burns grew up in Kalamazoo, Michigan and graduated from Kalamazoo Central High School in 1981. He then attended Taylor University. Since working in the NASCAR industry, he has lived in Concord, North Carolina, which is in the Charlotte metropolitan area where NASCAR teams are based.

References

External links
 Dave Burns NBC bio

1963 births
American television reporters and correspondents
Living people
Taylor University alumni
Motorsport announcers
People from Kalamazoo, Michigan
NASCAR people
American television sports announcers